Belleville is a hamlet and census-designated place (CDP) in the town of Ellisburg, Jefferson County, New York, United States. The population was 226 at the 2010 census.

It was an incorporated village from 1860 to 1930.

Geography
Belleville is in southern Jefferson County, in the northern part of the town of Ellisburg. The community sits on both sides of Sandy Creek, a southwesterly-flowing direct tributary of Lake Ontario. The main crossroads in the hamlet is on the north side of the creek. New York State Route 289 leads south  to the village of Ellisburg and northeast (upstream)  to New York State Route 178. County Route 75 runs north and southwest from the Belleville crossroads.

Demographics

Notes

Census-designated places in New York (state)
Hamlets in New York (state)
Census-designated places in Jefferson County, New York
Hamlets in Jefferson County, New York
Former villages in New York (state)